Gallup is a surname of English origin. Notable people with the surname include:

Albert Gallup (1796–1851), American politician
Alec Gallup (1928–2009), American pollster
Annie Gallup, American singer and songwriter
Barry Gallup, American football coach
Caroline Gallup Reed (1821-1914), American educator
Cliff Gallup (1930–1988), American guitarist
David Gallup (1808–1882), American politician
Dick Gallup (1941-2021), American poet
Elizabeth Wells Gallup (1848–1934), American educator and scholar
Felicity Gallup (born 1969), British badminton player
George Gallup (1901–1984), American pollster, creator of the Gallup Poll
George Gallup Jr. (1930–2011), American pollster, writer, and executive
Gordon G. Gallup (born 1941), American psychologist
Harvey A. Gallup (1869–1946), American politician
John Gallup (1619-1675), English militia captain and early American settler
John Luke Gallup (born 1962), American economist
Michael Gallup (born 1996), American football player
Simon Gallup  (born 1960), British musician and guitarist

See also
Gallop (disambiguation)